SC Dnipro-1 is a professional Ukrainian football team from Dnipro. While not officially a successor of FC Dnipro, SC Dnipro-1 took over all of the infrastructure of the former club including its academy. Founded in 2015, SC Dnipro-1 is competing in the Ukrainian Premier League, having been promoted from the First League in 2019.

History
The club owners are Maksym Bereza and Hennadiy Polonskyi. The club adopted an emblem and name similar to the Special Tasks Patrol Police Dnipro-1 — a Ukrainian volunteer battalion formed during the War in Donbas that used to be led by Yuriy Bereza (Maksym Bereza's father) which represents the Lisovskyi tryzub.

The Professional Football League of Ukraine reviewed the matter of admitting the club SC Dnipro-1 on 21 June 2017.

On 6 July 2017, it was announced that SC Dnipro-1 would adopt the FC Dnipro football school. The same day SC Dnipro-1 announced its squad for the upcoming 2017–18 Ukrainian Second League season, having a number of well known footballers in Ukraine such as Yevhen Cheberyachko, Serhiy Kravchenko and many others.

Its first game on professional level the club played on 9 July 2017 hosting FC Bukovyna Chernivtsi as part of the 2017–18 Ukrainian Cup. Its first official league game the club played next week on 15 July 2017 hosting FC Metalist 1925 Kharkiv as part of the 2017–18 Ukrainian Second League. That season Dnipro-1 became the second club in history of the Ukrainian Cup that reached the semifinals while competing at the third tier and also earned promotion by placing the first place in its group.

As champion of the 2018–19 Ukrainian First League Dnipro-1 promoted to the Ukrainian Premier League in 2019.

Due to 2022 Russian invasion of Ukraine, Dnipro-1 completed 2022–23 UEFA Europa Conference League campaign at Košická futbalová aréna in Košice, Slovakia, while conducting training sessions in nearby Malá Ida and completing domestic league fixtures in Uzhhorod. Multiple members of the first team relocated to Košice temporarily for the duration of the campaign.

Critical perception: SC Dnipro-1 vs FC Dnipro
In 2018 FC Dnipro was forced into bankruptcy by FIFA due to multiple legal claims for failing to pay its promised monetary compensation to players and managers.

Among members of the former football club Dnipro that never got paid, there are Egídio Pereira Júnior, Danilo Sousa Campos, manager Juande Ramos and his coaching staff, Jaba Kankava, Vitaliy Mandzyuk, and others.

On 22 February 2021, FIFA dismissed the claim of Jaba Kankava who appealed with a request to recognize SC Dnipro-1 a sports successor of FC Dnipro in order to recover his unpaid salary from FC Dnipro.

Other former players perceive the creation of SC Dnipro-1 as a type of scheme.

Players

First-team squad

Out on loan

Coaches and administration

League and cup history

{|class="wikitable"
|-bgcolor="#efefef"
! Season
! Div.
! Pos.
! Pl.
! W
! D
! L
! GS
! GA
! P
!Cup
!colspan=2|Europe
!Notes
|-bgcolor=PowderBlue
|align=center|2017–18
|align=center|Druha Liha
|align=center bgcolor= gold|1
|align=center|33
|align=center|26
|align=center|3
|align=center|4
|align=center|87
|align=center|15
|align=center|81
|align=center bgcolor=tan|1/2 finals
|align=center|
|align=center|
|align=center bgcolor=lightgreen|Promoted
|-bgcolor=LightCyan
|align=center|2018–19
|align=center|Persha Liha
|align=center bgcolor= gold|1
|align=center|28
|align=center|21
|align=center|4
|align=center|3
|align=center|72
|align=center|21
|align=center|67
|align=center bgcolor=tan|1/2 finals
|align=center|
|align=center|
|align=center bgcolor=lightgreen|Promoted
|-
| align="center" |2019–20
| align="center" rowspan=10|Premier Liha
| align="center" |7
| align="center" |32
| align="center" |15
| align="center" |4
| align="center" |13
| align="center" |42
| align="center" |42
| align="center" |49
| align="center" | finals
| align=center   |
| align=center   |
| align="center" |
|-
| align="center" |2020–21
| align="center" |7
| align="center" |26
| align="center" |8
| align="center" |6
| align="center" |12
| align="center" |36
| align="center" |38
| align="center" |30
| align="center" | finals
| align=center   |
| align=center   |
| align="center" |
|-
| align="center" |2021–22
| align="center" |3
| align="center" |18
| align="center" |13
| align="center" |1
| align="center" |4
| align="center" |35
| align="center" |17
| align="center" |40
| align="center" | finals
| align=center   |
| align=center   |
| align="center" |
|-
| align="center" |2022–23
| align="center" | 
| align="center" |
| align="center" |
| align="center" |
| align="center" |
| align="center" |
| align="center" |
| align="center" | 
| align="center" |
| align=center   |
| align=center   |
| align="center" |
|-
|}

European record

Notes
 PO: Play-off round

Honours
 Ukrainian First League
 Winners (1): 2018–19
 Ukrainian Second League
 Runners-up (1): 2017–18

Reserves
In 2019 the club also fielded its reserve team in amateur competitions SC Dnipro-1-Borysfen that previously (in 2018–19) played at the Youth League and PFL under-19 competitions. The team played in the under-19 competitions along with SC Dnipro-1 under-19 team which won the competitions.

Managers

 Dmytro Mykhaylenko (6 July 2017 – 18 September 2020)
 Igor Jovićević (22 September 2020 – 13 July 2022)
 Oleksandr Kucher (29 July 2022 – present)

Notes

References

 
Ukrainian Premier League clubs
Association football clubs established in 2017
2017 establishments in Ukraine
Football clubs in Dnipro